Francis William Holbrooke Adams (June 26, 1904 – April 20, 1990) was an American lawyer who served as the New York City Police Commissioner from 1954 to 1955.

Biography
Adams was born in Mount Vernon, New York on June 26, 1904. He grew up in Saddle River, New Jersey and rode to horseback to school in nearby Ho-Ho-Kus, New Jersey.  He graduated from Williams College in 1925 and Fordham Law School in 1928.  Upon graduation, he joined the firm O'Brien, Boardman, Memhard, Fox & Early, where he had worked as a clerk while in law school.

In 1934, he became assistant United States Attorney for the Southern District of New York.

Adams also served as an assistant counsel to the 1963–64 Warren Commission (the "President's Commission on the Assassination of President Kennedy").

He died on April 20, 1990 in Devon, Pennsylvania.

References

External links

New York City Police Commissioners
Warren Commission counsel and staff
1904 births
1990 deaths
Williams College alumni
Fordham University School of Law alumni
People from Mount Vernon, New York
People from Saddle River, New Jersey